The draw of the preliminary groups of the inaugural 2008 I-League 2nd Division  was carried out at Football House, Dwarka on 25 February 2008. The 12 participating teams have been drawn into two groups of six teams each to be played in Balewadi Sports Complex Pune and Rajarshi Shahu Stadium Kolhapur. The final round would be played in Guwahati, Assam.

The top-four team in the I-League 2nd Division will qualify for the I-League (2008–2009), while the rest will be remain to I League Division 2 in the next season.

The AIFF has selected Pune and Kolhapur as preliminary round venues to take the game to different cities. Both the venues have good stadiums and two practice grounds each, making them ideal venues for the I-League Division 2.

Standings

Group A

Last updated: 29 February 2008

Group B
Last updated: 29 February 2008

All the match of this Group will be play in Kolhapur

Fixtures and results

Group A

Last updated: 29 February 2008

The home team is listed in the left-hand column.

Group B
Last updated: 29 February 2008

The home team is listed in the left-hand column.

Final round

External links

I-League 2nd Division seasons
2
India